Olaf Klose (13 January 1903 − 22 March 1987) was a German art historian and librarian.

Life and career 
Born in Bad Doberan, Klose studied History, art history and North Germanic languages. In 1929 with the work Die Familienverhältnisse auf Island. Vor der Bekehrung zum Christentum auf Grund der Islendingasögur presented at the University of Leipzig he was awarded the title of Dr. phil. Doctorate promoted. He then worked in libraries in Kiel, Berlin, Marburg and Copenhagen. 

Klose died at the age of 84.

Awards 
 1968: Order of Merit of the Federal Republic of Germany 1st classe
 University medal of the Christian-Albrechts-Universität zu Kiel.
 1969: Honorary Professorship of the Landes Schleswig-Holstein in Würdigung seiner Verdienste um das Bibliothekswesen in Schleswig-Holstein und um die Erforschung der schleswig-holsteinischen Geschichte.

Publications 
 Die Familienverhältnisse auf Island. Vor der Bekehrung zum Christentum auf Grund der Islendingasögur. Dissertation. University of Leipzig 1929. Westermann, Braunschweig 1929, .
 Islandkatalog der Universitätsbibliothek Kiel und der Universitäts- und Stadtbibliothek Köln. Universitätsbibliothek, Kiel 1931, .
 Die nordische Professur in Kiel in der 2. Hälfte des 19. Jahrhunderts. Quellen zur Geschichte der Beziehungen zwischen Kiel und dem Norden. In De Libris. Bibliofile Breve til Ejnar Munksgaard paa 50-Aarsdagen 28. Februar. Kopenhagen 1940, .
 with Hans Hingst, : Geschichte Schleswig-Holsteins. Wachholtz, Neumünster 1955–1960.
 Schleswig-Holstein und Hamburg. Kröner, Stuttgart 1958. 2nd edition 1964.
 Die Jahrzehnte der Wiedervereinigung 1721–73. In Geschichte Schleswig-Holsteins. VI, 1959, .
 Ferdinand Tönnies, Friedrich Paulsen. Briefwechsel 1876–1908. Ed. together with Georg Jacoby and Irma Fischer. Hirt, Kiel 1961 (Publications of the Schleswig-Holstein University Society, N.F., 27).
 with : Ortsansichten und Stadtpläne der Herzogtümer Schleswig, Holstein und Lauenburg. Wachholtz, Neumünster 1962.
 Dänemark. Handbuch der historischen Stätten. Kröner, Stuttgart 1982, .

Literature 
  (ed.): Schleswig-Holstein und der Norden. Festschrift für Olaf Klose zum 65. Geburtstag. Wachholtz, Neumünster 1968, .
 Klose, Olaf. In Carsten Mish: Otto Scheel (1876–1954). Eine biographische Studie zu Lutherforschung, Landeshistoriographie und deutsch-dänischen Beziehungen. Vandenhoeck & Ruprecht, Göttingen 2015, .

References

External links 
 
 Olaf Klose on the Website of the 

German art historians
German librarians
Officers Crosses of the Order of Merit of the Federal Republic of Germany
1903 births
1987 deaths
Doberan